The 1973–74 season of the European Cup football club tournament was won for the first time by Bayern Munich, beginning their own three-year period of domination, in a replayed final against Atlético Madrid, the only such occasion in the tournament's final. This was the first time the cup went to Germany, and the only European Cup final to require a replay after the first match was drawn 1–1 after extra time.

Ajax, the three-time defending champions, were eliminated by CSKA September Flag in the second round.

Bracket
{{32TeamBracket|legs=2/2/2/2/1|aggregate=y|seeds=n|compact=y|byes=1|nowrap=y
| RD1=Preliminary round
| RD2=First round
| RD3=Quarter-finals
| RD4=Semi-finals
| RD5=Final

| RD1-team01= Viking
| RD1-score01-1=1
| RD1-score01-2=0
| RD1-score01-agg=1
| RD1-team02= Spartak Trnava
| RD1-score02-1=2
| RD1-score02-2=1
| RD1-score02-agg=3

| RD1-team03= Zorja Luhans'k
| RD1-score03-1=2
| RD1-score03-2=1
| RD1-score03-agg=3
| RD1-team04= APOEL
| RD1-score04-1=0
| RD1-score04-2=0
| RD1-score04-agg=0

| RD1-team05= Benfica
| RD1-score05-1=1
| RD1-score05-2=1
| RD1-score05-agg=2
| RD1-team06= Olympiakós
| RD1-score06-1=0
| RD1-score06-2=0
| RD1-score06-agg=0

| RD1-team07= Waterford United
| RD1-score07-1=2
| RD1-score07-2=0
| RD1-score07-agg=2
| RD1-team08= Újpesti| RD1-score08-1=3
| RD1-score08-2=3
| RD1-score08-agg=6

| RD1-team09= Bayern München| RD1-score09-1=3
| RD1-score09-2=1
| RD1-score09-agg=4(4)
| RD1-team10= Åtvidaberg
| RD1-score10-1=1
| RD1-score10-2=3
| RD1-score10-agg=4(3)

| RD1-team11= Dynamo Dresden| RD1-score11-1=2
| RD1-score11-2=2
| RD1-score11-agg=4
| RD1-team12= Juventus
| RD1-score12-1=0
| RD1-score12-2=3
| RD1-score12-agg=3

| RD1-team15= CSKA| RD1-score15-1=3
| RD1-score15-2=1
| RD1-score15-agg=4
| RD1-team16= Wacker
| RD1-score16-1=0
| RD1-score16-2=0
| RD1-score16-agg=0

| RD1-team17= Club Brugge 
| RD1-score17-1=8
| RD1-score17-2=2
| RD1-score17-agg=10
| RD1-team18= Floriana
| RD1-score18-1=0
| RD1-score18-2=0
| RD1-score18-agg=0

| RD1-team19= Basel| RD1-score19-1=5
| RD1-score19-2=6
| RD1-score19-agg=11
| RD1-team20= Fram
| RD1-score20-1=0
| RD1-score20-2=2
| RD1-score20-agg=2

| RD1-team21= TPS
| RD1-score21-1=1
| RD1-score21-2=0
| RD1-score21-agg=1
| RD1-team22= Celtic| RD1-score22-1=6
| RD1-score22-2=3
| RD1-score22-agg=9

| RD1-team23= Vejle| RD1-score23-1=2
| RD1-score23-2=1
| RD1-score23-agg=3
| RD1-team24= Nantes
| RD1-score24-1=2
| RD1-score24-2=0
| RD1-score24-agg=2

| RD1-team25= Crvena zvezda| RD1-score25-1=2
| RD1-score25-2=1
| RD1-score25-agg=3
| RD1-team26= Stal Mielec
| RD1-score26-1=1
| RD1-score26-2=0
| RD1-score26-agg=1

| RD1-team27= Jeunesse Esch
| RD1-score27-1=1
| RD1-score27-2=0
| RD1-score27-agg=1
| RD1-team28= Liverpool| RD1-score28-1=1
| RD1-score28-2=2
| RD1-score28-agg=3

| RD1-team29= Crusaders
| RD1-score29-1=0
| RD1-score29-2=0
| RD1-score29-agg=0
| RD1-team30= Dinamo București| RD1-score30-1=1
| RD1-score30-2=11
| RD1-score30-agg=12

| RD1-team31= Atlético Madrid| RD1-score31-1=0
| RD1-score31-2=1
| RD1-score31-agg=1
| RD1-team32= Galatasaray
| RD1-score32-1=0
| RD1-score32-2=0
| RD1-score32-agg=0

|RD2-team01= Spartak Trnava|RD2-score01-1=0
|RD2-score01-2=1
|RD2-score01-agg=1
|RD2-team02= Zorja Luhans'k
|RD2-score02-1=0
|RD2-score02-2=0
|RD2-score02-agg=0

|RD2-team03= Benfica
|RD2-score03-1=1
|RD2-score03-2=0
|RD2-score03-agg=1
|RD2-team04= Újpesti|RD2-score04-1=1
|RD2-score04-2=2
|RD2-score04-agg=3

|RD2-team05= Bayern München|RD2-score05-1=4
|RD2-score05-2=3
|RD2-score05-agg=7
|RD2-team06= Dynamo Dresden
|RD2-score06-1=3
|RD2-score06-2=3
|RD2-score06-agg=6

|RD2-team07= Ajax
|RD2-score07-1=1
|RD2-score07-2=0
|RD2-score07-agg=1
|RD2-team08= CSKA|RD2-score08-1=0
|RD2-score08-2=2
|RD2-score08-agg=2

|RD2-team09= Club Brugge
|RD2-score09-1=2
|RD2-score09-2=4
|RD2-score09-agg=6
|RD2-team10= Basel|RD2-score10-1=1
|RD2-score10-2=6
|RD2-score10-agg=7

|RD2-team11= Celtic|RD2-score11-1=0
|RD2-score11-2=1
|RD2-score11-agg=1
|RD2-team12= Vejle
|RD2-score12-1=0
|RD2-score12-2=0
|RD2-score12-agg=0

|RD2-team13= Crvena zvezda|RD2-score13-1=2
|RD2-score13-2=2
|RD2-score13-agg=4
|RD2-team14= Liverpool
|RD2-score14-1=1
|RD2-score14-2=1
|RD2-score14-agg=2

|RD2-team15= Dinamo București
|RD2-score15-1=0
|RD2-score15-2=2
|RD2-score15-agg=2
|RD2-team16= Atlético Madrid|RD2-score16-1=2
|RD2-score16-2=2
|RD2-score16-agg=4

|RD3-team01= Spartak Trnava
|RD3-score01-1=1
|RD3-score01-2=1
|RD3-score01-agg=2(3)
|RD3-team02= Újpesti|RD3-score02-1=1
|RD3-score02-2=1
|RD3-score02-agg=2(4)

|RD3-team03= Bayern München|RD3-score03-1=4
|RD3-score03-2=1
|RD3-score03-agg=5
|RD3-team04= CSKA
|RD3-score04-1=1
|RD3-score04-2=2
|RD3-score04-agg=3

|RD3-team05= Basel
|RD3-score05-1=3
|RD3-score05-2=2
|RD3-score05-agg=5
|RD3-team06= Celtic|RD3-score06-1=2
|RD3-score06-2=4
|RD3-score06-agg=6

|RD3-team07= Crvena zvezda
|RD3-score07-1=0
|RD3-score07-2=0
|RD3-score07-agg=0
|RD3-team08= Atlético Madrid|RD3-score08-1=2
|RD3-score08-2=0
|RD3-score08-agg=2

|RD4-team01= Újpesti
|RD4-score01-1=1
|RD4-score01-2=0
|RD4-score01-agg=1
|RD4-team02= Bayern München|RD4-score02-1=1
|RD4-score02-2=3
|RD4-score02-agg=4

|RD4-team03= Celtic
|RD4-score03-1=0
|RD4-score03-2=0
|RD4-score03-agg=0
|RD4-team04= Atlético Madrid|RD4-score04-1=0
|RD4-score04-2=2
|RD4-score04-agg=2

|RD5-team01= Bayern München'|RD5-score01-1=1
|RD5-score01-2=4
|RD5-team02= Atlético Madrid
|RD5-score02-1=1
|RD5-score02-2=0
}}

First round

|}

First leg

Second legSpartak Trnava won 3–1 on aggregate.Zorya Voroshilovgrad won 3–0 on aggregate.Benfica won 2–0 on aggregate.Újpesti Dózsa won 6–2 on aggregate.4–4 on aggregate; Bayern Munich won on penalties.Dynamo Dresden won 4–3 on aggregate.CSKA September Flag won 4–0 on aggregate.Club Brugge won 10–0 on aggregate.Basel won 11–2 on aggregate.Celtic won 9–1 on aggregate.Vejle won 3–2 on aggregate.Red Star Belgrade won 3–1 on aggregate.Liverpool won 3–1 on aggregate.Dinamo București won 12–0 on aggregate.Atletico Madrid won 1–0 on aggregate.Second round

|}

First leg

Second legSpartak Trnava won 1–0 on aggregate.Újpesti Dózsa won 3–1 on aggregate.Bayern Munich won 7–6 on aggregate.CSKA September Flag won 2–1 on aggregate.Basel won 7–6 on aggregate.Celtic won 1–0 on aggregate.Red Star Belgrade won 4–2 on aggregate.Atlético Madrid won 4–2 on aggregate.Quarter-finals

|}

First leg

Second leg2–2 on aggregate; Újpesti Dózsa won on penalties.Bayern Munich won 5–3 on aggregate.Celtic won 6–5 on aggregate.Atlético Madrid won 2–0 on aggregate.Semi-finals

|}

First leg

Second legBayern Munich won 4–1 on aggregateAtlético Madrid won 2–0 on aggregate''

Final

Replay

Top scorers

Notes

References

External links
1973–74 All matches – season at UEFA website
 European Cup results at Rec.Sport.Soccer Statistics Foundation
 All scorers 1973–74 European Cup according to protocols UEFA
1973-74 European Cup – results and line-ups (archive)

1973–74 in European football
European Champion Clubs' Cup seasons